Vain Glory Opera is the third (or second "official") studio album by the German power metal band Edguy, released in 1998. It was mixed by Stratovarius' Timo Tolkki, who also played additional lead guitar on "Out Of Control", and featured additional lead and backing vocals by Hansi Kürsch of Blind Guardian on "Out of Control" and the title track "Vain Glory Opera." Further choir vocals were supplied by Ralf Zdiarstek and Norman Meiritz. At the time of recording the album, Edguy had not yet chosen a permanent drummer to succeed Dominik Storch. So session musician Frank Lindenthal, a good friend of the band, was asked to play drums on the album.

"Hymn" is a cover version of the song from the album Quartet (1982) by the British new wave band Ultravox.

Track listing
Music and lyrics by Tobias Sammet, except where indicated

 "Overture" – 1:31
 "Until We Rise Again" – 4:28
 "How Many Miles" (Edguy, Sammet) – 5:39
 "Scarlet Rose" – 5:10
 "Out of Control" (Edguy, Sammet) – 5:04
 "Vain Glory Opera" – 6:08
 "Fairytale" (Edguy, Sammet) – 5:11
 "Walk on Fighting" (Edguy, Sammet) – 4:46
 "Tomorrow" – 3:53
 "No More Foolin'" (Edguy, Sammet) – 4:55
 "Hymn" (Midge Ure, Billy Currie, Chris Cross, Warren Cann) – 4:53 (Ultravox cover) 
 "But Here I Am" - 4:33 (Japanese edition bonus track)

Personnel
Band members
Tobias Sammet – vocals, bass, keyboards
Jens Ludwig – guitars
Dirk Sauer – guitars

Additional musicians
Frank Lindenthal – drums
Ralf Zdiarstek, Norman Meiritz, Andy Allendörfer – backing vocals
Hansi Kürsch – additional vocals on tracks 5 and 6
Timo Tolkki – guitar solo on track 5

Production
Andy Allendörfer, Nils Wasko - executive producers
Norman Meiritz - engineer
Timo Tolkki - mixing
Mika Jussila - mastering at Finnvox Studios, Helsinki

References

Edguy albums
1998 albums
AFM Records albums